We All Belong is the fourth album by Dr. Dog. It was released on February 27, 2007. The album finds the band adding more to their typical indie-rock sound, including a wider variety of instruments and psychedelic group harmony. The entire record, as well as the preceding Takers and Leavers EP, was recorded on 24-track tape. This album was number 39 on Rolling Stones list of the Top 50 Albums of 2007. The song "Old News" was number 40 on Rolling Stones list of the 100 Best Songs of 2007. The album was twice sampled, by rapper Chiddy Bang, "Ain't It Strange" on "Grab a Plate" and "My Old Ways" by The Preview's "Old Ways".

Track listing
"Old News" – 1:51
"My Old Ways" – 3:31
"Keep a Friend" – 3:32
"The Girl" – 3:28
"Alaska" – 3:59
"Weekend" – 2:44
"Ain't It Strange" – 4:28
"Worst Trip" – 3:00
"The Way the Lazy Do" – 3:37
"Die, Die, Die" – 3:04
"We All Belong" – 5:17
"I Hope There's Love" – 4:08 (Bonus track available on iTunes and a limited edition 7")
"Goner" – 4:17 (Bonus track available on limited edition 7", and from Takers and Leavers)

Credits
Dr. Dog is:
Toby "Tables" Leaman – writing, bass, vocals
Scott "Taxi" McMicken – writing, lead guitar, vocals
Frank's "Thanks" Beard – rhythm guitar, vocals
Zach "Text" Miller – piano, keyboards, harpsichord
Juston "Triumph" Stens - drums, percussion, vocals

Additional Musicians
Brendan Cooney - string/horn arrangement (track 11), trombone
Dan Scofield - tenor/alto/baritone sax
John Petit - trumpet
Carlos Santiago - violins
Mel Leaman - backing vocals (track 6)

References

2007 albums
Dr. Dog albums